Taji or Al-Taji is a rural town around 30 kilometers (18 mi) north of the city of Baghdad, within Baghdad Governorate and Saladin Governorate.

Taji has about 200,000 inhabitants. Many are Sunni Arab Muslims who work in the farming and agriculture sector.

History
Al-Taji airfield, in the volatile Sunni Triangle, was originally an Iraqi Republican Guard base during the Saddam era. It was once a center for the manufacture of chemical weapons. Taji was also the location of the largest tank maintenance facility in Iraq. Al-Taji airfield came under American control following the US invasion and was subsequently renamed Camp Cooke.

See also
 Baghdad Districts
 List of cities in Iraq
Iraq war

External links
 Iraq Image - Taji Satellite Observation

Populated places in Baghdad Province